Tawai Keiruan (born 3 September 1972 in Tanna) is a Vanuatuan athlete.

Keiruan competed in two Summer Olympics for his country, firstly at the 1992 Summer Olympics in Barcelona, he entered the 5000 metres where he finished 13th out of 14 starters so not qualifying for the final, four years later at the 1996 Summer Olympics in Atlanta he entered the 1500 metres and came last in his heat so again he didn't qualify for the next round.

References

External links
 

1972 births
Living people
Vanuatuan male middle-distance runners
Vanuatuan male long-distance runners
Athletes (track and field) at the 1992 Summer Olympics
Athletes (track and field) at the 1996 Summer Olympics
Olympic athletes of Vanuatu